Ishakidris is a genus of ants in the subfamily Myrmicinae containing the single species Ishakidris ascitaspis. The genus is known only from a single worker collected in 1978 from the leaf litter in the Gunung Mulu National Park, Sarawak, Malaysian Borneo.

References

Myrmicinae
Monotypic ant genera
Insects described in 1984
Hymenoptera of Asia